The  was a limited express train service operated in Kyushu, Japan by Kyushu Railway Company (JR Kyushu). It operated from 1 October 1950 to 12 March 2021.

History

With the opening of the Kyushu Shinkansen, the number of Ariake services gradually decreased.

On 12 February 2021, JR Kyushu announced the discontinuation of the Ariake. The last service operated on 12 March 2021.

References

External links

 JR Kyushu Ariake train information 

Named passenger trains of Japan
Kyushu Railway Company
Railway services introduced in 1950